Tomáš Stráský (born April 15, 1987 in České Budějovice) was a Czech footballer. He played the position of centre-forward. Stráský retired on July 1, 2020 at the age of 33.

External links

Tomáš Stráský-Profile

1987 births
Living people
Association football forwards
Czech footballers
Czech First League players
SK Dynamo České Budějovice players
Sportspeople from České Budějovice
21st-century Czech people